WSIS may refer to:

 WSIS (FM), a radio station (88.7 FM) licensed to Riverside, Michigan, United States
 World Summit on the Information Society